Mark Edward Smith (5 March 1957 – 24 January 2018) was an English singer, who was the lead singer, lyricist and only constant member of the post-punk group the Fall. Smith formed the band after attending the June 1976 Sex Pistols gig at the Lesser Free Trade Hall in Manchester and was its leader until his death. During their 42-year existence, the Fall's line-up included some sixty musicians, with whom Smith released 31 studio albums and numerous singles and EPs.

Smith had a difficult and complex personality and was a long-term alcoholic. He was known for his biting and targeted wit, evident in interviews, for which he was much in demand by music journalists throughout his career. He was suspicious of the trappings of fame and largely avoided socialising with people associated with the music scene, including other Fall members. The dark and sardonic aspect of his personality often appears in his lyrics; he especially derided music industry people. Smith's approach to music was unconventional and he did not have high regard for musicianship, stating that "rock & roll isn't even music really. It's a mistreating of instruments to get feelings over".

The Fall are regarded as one of the most important and influential post-punk bands of the 1980s, 1990s, and 2000s. Although Smith was difficult to work with, he was revered by fans and critics, and on his death was described as a "strange kind of antimatter national treasure".

Life and career

Early life
Smith was born to working-class parents Irene (née Brownhill) and Jack Smith, in Broughton, Salford, the eldest of four siblings. He had three sisters: Suzanne (who later painted the front sleeve for the 1980 Fall album Grotesque (After the Gramme)), Caroline, and Barbara.  His grandfather, James Brownhill, had been involved at the Dunkirk evacuation and fought in France during the Second World War. Jack was too young to have fought in the war, but joined the army as soon as he was old enough. Smith's parents had moved to nearby Sedgley Park, Prestwich after their marriage in 1955. Smith's father died suddenly in 1989 of a heart attack.

According to Simon Ford, Smith did not become interested in music until he was about 14, when his father "allowed a record player into the house". The first single he bought was Paranoid by Black Sabbath, and his first gig was the Groundhogs at Manchester's Free Trade Hall. He attended Sedgley Park Primary School, and later Stand Grammar School for Boys before quitting aged 16. That year, he left home and moved in with his girlfriend and future Fall keyboardist, Una Baines, later of the Blue Orchids. He subsequently took an evening class in A-level Literature. His first job was in a meat factory before he became a shipping clerk on Salford docks.

The Fall

The Fall were named after the novel by Albert Camus, and initially consisted of Smith and his friends Martin Bramah, Una Baines and Tony Friel. By this time, Smith was unemployed, having dropped out of college at the age of 19. He gave up his job as a shipping clerk at Salford docks shortly afterward to focus on the band. Their early line-up was formed from early members of the punk rock movement. However, their music underwent numerous stylistic changes, often concurrently with changes in the group's line-up. The Fall's 40-year career can be broken into five broad periods, based on the band's membership. These include their early late 1970s line-up, the classic Fall period of Hanley and dual drummers, the Brix years of 1984-89, their early 1990s revival, and everything after the on-stage fight in New York, after which Hanley quit and Smith was arrested (see below).

He married American guitarist and Fall member Brix Smith on 19 July 1983, after they met in April 1983 in Chicago during a Fall American tour. She joined the group on guitar and vocals for the album Perverted by Language and co-wrote some of the best-regarded Fall tracks from the period, and is widely credited for introducing a  more mainstream, pop-oriented element to the group's sound. She remained with the Fall until the couple divorced in 1989.

Smith remarried twice after this. His second marriage to Saffron Prior, who had worked for The Fall's fan club, ended in divorce in 1995. He married Eleni Poulou, also called Elenor or Elena, in 2001. Poulou joined the band in September 2002 and left in July 2016. Smith and Poulou divorced in 2016, and Smith's partner at the time of his death was his manager Pamela Vander.

Referring to the Fall's 60-odd former members, Smith claimed that he had "only" fired around half the number of people he is said to have dismissed, and that some left of their own free will. He would fire musicians for seemingly trivial reasons; he once dismissed a sound engineer for eating a salad, later explaining that "the salad was the last straw". Marc Riley was fired for dancing to a Clash song during their Australian tour, although the two had had many arguments beforehand. Smith said that he often changed musicians so that they would not become lazy or complacent.

When the influential British DJ and Fall supporter John Peel died in 2004, Smith made a notorious appearance on the BBC's Newsnight show in which he seemed stunned and incoherent, and which he afterwards put down to a rare incidence of stage fright.

While the Fall never achieved widespread success beyond minor hit singles in the mid and late 1980s, they maintained a loyal cult following throughout their career. Steve Hanley is regarded by some as one of the most talented bassists of his generation, equal to Peter Hook, Andy Rourke or Gary Mounfield.

Solo work and collaboration
Alongside his work with The Fall, Smith released two spoken-word solo albums, The Post-Nearly Man (1998) and Pander! Panda! Panzer! (2002). Both feature readings of Fall lyrics set to electronic sound collages and samples of Fall songs, as well as contributions from members of The Fall. Smith appeared as a guest vocalist for Edwyn Collins, Elastica, Gorillaz, Long Fin Killie, Mouse on Mars, Coldcut and Ghostigital. His contribution to Inspiral Carpets' 1994 song "I Want You" won UK top 20 recognition, topped John Peel's influential Festive Fifty and resulted in Smith's first appearance on the UK TV show Top of the Pops. He worked with Mouse on Mars on the project Von Südenfed, whose first album, Tromatic Reflexxions, was released in May 2007. Smith provided guest vocals on the song "Glitter Freeze" from the 2010 Gorillaz album Plastic Beach, and joined the group Shuttleworth to record the World Cup song "England's Heartbeat".

In 1986, he wrote the play Hey, Luciani, based on the short reign of Pope John Paul I. Smith made a cameo appearance in the Michael Winterbottom film 24 Hour Party People (2002), while his younger self was portrayed by Sam Riley in a section that did not make the final cut of the film, but appears as a deleted scene on the DVD. Smith made an appearance in the BBC Three sitcom Ideal in May 2007, playing a foulmouthed, chain-smoking Jesus. A fuzzy, muted version of Fall song "Hip Priest" (1982) appeared in the 1991 film The Silence of the Lambs.

Lyrical and vocal style

Smith sang with a heavy Mancunian accent, and wrote in a cryptic style. His abstruse song titles, often derived from cutting out words and phrases from books and newspapers,  reflect the same tendency, with a notable example being "To Nkroachment: Yarbles" (1985). His vocal style was similarly unusual, and his delivery is known for his tendency to end phrases with an "ah"-sound. He often speak-sang or sing-slurred his lyrics, especially from the mid-1990s. His singing voice, particularly when playing live, has been described as "rambling", and he often interjected improvised rants between verses. He tended to write lyrics as free form prose into one of his many notebooks, and only later set them to pieces of music composed by Fall musicians. He was a prolific writer who often wrote in dense continuous prose, which he would later edit down into lyrics.

A number of his vocal tracks were recorded spontaneously at his home, when he sang into a dictaphone or cassette recorder, most notably sections of "Paintwork" from the Fall's 1985 album "This Nation's Saving Grace", which also includes the voice of Alan Cooper discussing main sequence stars, from a documentary Smith happened to be watching at the time. He later adapted the resulting sound effect in the studio; examples include for the intro to "Bad News Girl" (1988).

His ability as a prose writer is evident in songs that abandon the verse/chorus format in favour of a long continuous narrative. Examples include "Spectre Vs Rector" (1979), "The North Will Rise Again" (1980), "Winter (Hostel-Maxi)" and "Winter 2" (1982), and "Wings" (1983). Fall songs written in this style are often not concerned with character or story development, more establishing a sense of place and atmosphere. By the late 1980s, Smith had largely given up this format. Some early songs concern one of his assumed alter-egos, though always from a third person point of view. Examples include Roman Totale XVII, "the bastard offspring of Charles I and the Great God Pan",  who appears in "The N.W.R.A" (1980), the live album Totale's Turns, "2nd Dark Age" (one of the b-sides to the "Fiery Jack" single), and the sleeve credits for Dragnet, as well as the characters in "Fiery Jack" (1980), "Hip Priest" (1982), "The Man Whose Head Expanded" (1983), and "Riddler" (1986). Rare first person narratives include "Frenz", "Carry Bag Man", and "The Steak Place" from 1988's The Frenz Experiment, as well as "Bill Is Dead" (1990) and "Edinburgh Man" (1991). He did not respond to requests to explain the meaning or sources behind his lyrics. When asked by a journalist as to how much of his self could be found in the song's characters, he replied "dunno, you're the one sitting there in your round glasses and leather jacket. You tell me what you think it's an extension of...for every bloke pulling a pint, there's about ten thousand journalists writing an article about it."

Fragments of his lyrics often appeared as handwritten scribbles on early Fall album and single covers, coupled with collages he had put together. In a 1983 interview with Sounds, Smith said that he liked artwork to reflect the album content and explained how his graphic choices reflected his attitude to music. He mentioned how he was drawn to cheap and misspelled posters, amateur layouts of local papers and printed cash and carry signs with "inverted commas where you don't need them". His technique was often imitated, for example on Pavement's early releases, which heavily resemble the artwork for Hex Enduction Hour (1982), and whom Smith described as "mere Fall copyists".

His lyrics were described by critic Simon Reynolds as "a kind of Northern English magic realism that mixed industrial grime with the unearthly and uncanny, voiced through a unique, one-note delivery somewhere between amphetamine-spiked rant and alcohol-addled yarn." He described his approach as wanting to combine "primitive music with intelligent lyrics". Thematically, his frequently densely layered words often centre around descriptions of urban grotesques, gloomy landscapes, "crackpot history", and are infused with regional slang. In interviews, Smith cited Colin Wilson, Arthur Machen, Wyndham Lewis, Thomas Hardy, M. R. James, Algernon Blackwood, Clark Ashton Smith, and Philip K. Dick as influences, as well as Edgar Allan Poe, Ezra Pound, Raymond Chandler, and H. P. Lovecraft.

Personality

Smith had a difficult and often reactionary personality, and was defiantly Northern English in outlook. Brix said that he carried "a chip on both shoulders. I remember him talking about fucking southern bastards a lot and not wanting to come to London. He hated London intensely. He's quite contrarian as a person and as a writer, which is what gives him his edge." Throughout his career, he clashed with musicians, record producers, sound engineers, record label heads and fellow Manchester scene alumni such as Tony Wilson, Peter Hook, Shaun Ryder and Morrissey, whom he disparagingly referred to as "Steven". Smith had a working class and anti-intellectual outlook, but a strong interest in literature. As the journalist Andrew Harrison observed, although he wished that a majority of his audience were miners and postmen, a great many were students or Guardian readers.

According to biographer Simon Ford, Smith often treated musicians as would "[a] bad tempered despot". He was highly charismatic and cultivated a wry and misanthropic personality during interviews and live performances. As an interviewee, his dry and caustic wit was very quotable, especially when he was critiquing other contemporary bands and "music personalities", a favoured pastime. He became a mainstay of the English music press throughout the 1980s and 1990s, and his sharp tongue often turned on the journalists themselves; many reported being nervous before meeting him, and published "war stories" afterwards.

During his later career performances he would often walk off stage or interfere with the musicians' instruments. During a 1998 gig at Brownies in New York, at a low point in his life when he was drinking heavily and band morale was at its lowest, he became involved in an onstage fight with the other musicians, which led to three Fall members, including long-term bassist Steve Hanley and drummer Karl Burns, quitting the band, and ended with Smith's arrest for assaulting his girlfriend and Fall keyboardist Julia Nagle. Smith was ordered to undergo treatment for alcohol abuse and anger management. After a period of good behaviour, the charges were dropped.

Smith said that his favourite things in life were "Scottish people, cats, Coronation Street, and Can". He was a passionate football fan and lifelong Manchester City follower: even appearing on the BBC's Final Score to read the classified football results. He admired mavericks such as George Best, whom he met and drank with, and observed how if Best could have drawn a crowd of 40,000 people a week he should have been able to "do what he liked".

Originally a Labour supporter, Smith left the party during the Falklands War (which he supported), then became further disillusioned with Labour during the Tony Blair era. In the 1997 election, he voted for the Conservative Party in opposition to Blair. Asked during a mid-1980s interview with Smash Hits as to what policies he would adopt if he became Prime Minister, he said "I'd halve the price of cigarettes, double the tax on health food, then I'd declare war on France." In a 2012 interview, Smith jokingly stated he would put the Queen in charge of Britain when asked the same question. Smith also expressed support for Brexit and Britain's withdrawal from the European Union. Although a longstanding member of the Musicians Union, he criticised their political outlook, stating “all they say is vote Corbyn and stay in the European Union."

Death
Smith died on 24 January 2018 after a long illness with lung and kidney cancer, aged 60 years. His health had been particularly bad during 2017, which led to performances in a wheelchair. A heavy smoker, Smith had long suffered from throat and respiratory problems. His work ethic and output, however, never declined and throughout his illness he continued to release a new album close to once a year.

Tributes to Smith included Brix Smith, Tim Burgess, Liam Gallagher, Andy Bell, Mat Osman, Billy Bragg, Win Butler, Cat Power, Edgar Wright, Pixies, Garbage, Stuart Murdoch, Terry Christian, Graham Coxon, Irvine Welsh and Gorillaz.

Legacy
Smith was both resigned and ambivalent about his legacy, especially in the terms of the fad-orientated music industry of which he was often harshly critical in his lyrics. He noted, somewhat bitterly, how "every artist wants credibility. A couple of years ago, I read a poll on the hundred best artists of all time. The Fall was in there between Mozart and Puccini. I was very proud of that. Of course, the next day I can pick up a paper and be the guy with no teeth who beats everybody up." Despite this, he was widely influential and critically acclaimed throughout his career, in part because he did not seek to capitalise on current trends which might have dated the band. He was particularly dismissive of the Madchester scene, as well as the post-punk revival bands of the 2000s who cited him and The Fall as an influence, whom he personally felt owed more to Talking Heads.

Similarly, he refused to look backwards; when recording he was adamant that the Fall not repeat themselves stylistically, and when playing live he refused to play old songs. The approach is further seen in his strategy of frequently replacing band members. Long-term fan John Peel said that "The Fall are the group against which all others must measure themselves", and when asked which Fall albums he would recommend to newcomers, he replied "all of them". In January 2005, Smith was the subject of The Fall: The Wonderful and Frightening World of Mark E. Smith, a BBC Four television documentary.

A number of alternative rock artists have mentioned Smith in their songs. The Jazz Butcher released "Southern Mark Smith" in 1983. German rock band Tocotronic mentioned him in their song "Ich habe geträumt, ich wäre Pizza essen mit Mark E. Smith" ("I dreamt I went to eat pizza with Mark E. Smith") on their 1996 album Wir kommen um uns zu beschweren (We come to complain). Elastica released the track "How He Wrote Elastica Man" in 2000, a reference to the 1980 Fall song "How I Wrote 'Elastic Man'", while in 2014 Fat White Family released an EP titled "I Am Mark E Smith". Sonic Youth covered three Fall songs, as well as the Kinks' "Victoria", which they released in 1990 as the 4 Tunna Brix EP. Cedric Bixler-Zavala, singer for the American groups At the Drive-In and The Mars Volta, described Smith as "one of the pillars of influence for me as lyricist and trouble maker."

Discography

The Fall

Solo work and collaborations

References

Footnotes

Citations

Sources

 
 

 
 
 .

External links

The Fall online formerly: The Official Fall Website & The Unofficial Fall Website
 The Annotated Fall Lyrics to The Fall's songs, annotated
The Fall "Totally Wired", Reykjavik 1981
The Fall, "Fortress" live in Reykjavik, 1981
Guardian interview (2005)
BBC Collective interview (2005)

1957 births
2018 deaths
Deaths from lung cancer
Deaths from kidney cancer
English lyricists
English male singers
English punk rock singers
English songwriters
British post-punk musicians
The Fall (band) members
Music in Salford
Musicians from Manchester
People from Broughton, Greater Manchester
Socialist Workers Party (UK) members
People educated at Stand Grammar School